Łaziska may refer to several localities in Poland:
Łaziska Górne, a town in Silesian Voivodeship (south Poland)
Łaziska, Silesian Voivodeship (south Poland)
Łaziska, Kielce County in Świętokrzyskie Voivodeship (south-central Poland)
Łaziska, Łódź Voivodeship (central Poland)
Łaziska, Lower Silesian Voivodeship (south-west Poland)
Łaziska, Opole Voivodeship (south-west Poland)
Łaziska, Płock County in Masovian Voivodeship (east-central Poland)
Łaziska, Pomeranian Voivodeship (north Poland)
Łaziska, Sochaczew County in Masovian Voivodeship (east-central Poland)
Łaziska, Staszów County in Świętokrzyskie Voivodeship (south-central Poland)
Łaziska, Zamość County in Lublin Voivodeship (east Poland)
Łaziska, Kuyavian-Pomeranian Voivodeship (north-central Poland)
Łaziska, Opole Lubelskie County in Lublin Voivodeship (east Poland)
Łaziska, Lipsko County in Masovian Voivodeship (east-central Poland)
Łaziska, Mińsk County in Masovian Voivodeship (east-central Poland)
Łaziska, Szydłowiec County in Masovian Voivodeship (east-central Poland)
Łaziska, Koło County in Greater Poland Voivodeship (west-central Poland)
Łaziska, Wągrowiec County in Greater Poland Voivodeship (west-central Poland)